Jonas Liorentas (1 August 1901 in Žvirgždaičiai – 8 July 1991 in Chicago) was a Lithuanian war pilot and officer of the Lithuanian Army.

In 1919 he volunteered into Lithuanian forces to the active combat with the Russian Soviet Army. In 1926 he entered Lithuanian Air Force.
After 1943 During German occupation, he became commander of the Lithuanian Liberation Army in Kaunas district. After defeat of German forces by the Soviet forces, he escaped to Switzerland. In 1953 he left to the United States and was active in Lithuanian national organizations.

Decorations
 Knight's Cross of the Order of the Cross of Vytis, 1919
 Knight's Cross of the Order of Vytautas the Great, 1931
 Knight of the Order of the White Lion, 1934

References
 

1901 births
1991 deaths
Lithuanian aviators
Lithuanian people of World War II
Lithuanian exiles
Recipients of the Order of the Cross of Vytis
Knights of the Order of Vytautas the Great
Knights of the Order of the White Lion
Lithuanian emigrants to the United States